Troll is an extended play by American musician James Ferraro. The EP was self-released to his Bandcamp page on November 26, 2017 with no prior announcement. The EP gained minor attention by online news sites who reported its release.

Background and composition
Hatsune Miku is used as a vocalist on several tracks, notably being the first time Ferraro's music has had strictly female vocals.

Track listing

References

James Ferraro albums
2017 EPs